This is a list of Italian football transfers for co-ownership resolutions, for the 2014–15 season, from and to Serie A and Serie B.

According to Article 102 bis of NOIF (Norme Organizzative Interne della F.I.G.C), the co-ownership deal must be confirmed each year. The deal may expire, be renewed, or one of the co-owners can buy back the other 50% of the player's rights. Deals that failed to form an agreement after the deadline, will be defined by auction between the 2 clubs: both clubs will submit their bid in a sealed envelope. Non-submission means the player's rights go to the other team for free. The mother club could sell their rights to third parties in a loan deal, like Emiliano Viviano in 2010, Andrea Masiello, Abdoulay Konko in January 2008 and Massimo Volta in circa 2007–08 and most recently Nicolas Viola in 2013.

Serie A deals
Deals involves at least one 2014–15 Serie A clubs

Serie B deals
Deals involves at least one 2014–15 Serie B clubs

References
general

 

specific

See also

2014–15 in Italian football
Italian
2014